The play-offs of the 2016 Fed Cup Asia/Oceania Zone Group I were the final stages of the Group I Zonal Competition involving teams from Asia and Oceania. Using the positions determined in their pools, the eight teams faced off to determine their placing in the 2016 Fed Cup Asia/Oceania Zone Group I. Chinese Taipei advanced to World Group II Play-offs, and Uzbekistan was relegated to the Asia/Oceania Zone Group II in 2017.

Pool results

Promotion play-off 
The first placed teams of the two pools were drawn in head-to-head rounds. The winner advanced to the World Group II Play-offs.

Japan vs. Chinese Taipei

3rd place play-off
The second placed teams of the two pools were drawn in head-to-head rounds to find third place teams.

Thailand vs. China

5th place play-off
The third placed teams of the two pools were drawn in head-to-head rounds to find fifth place teams.

India vs. Kazakhstan

Relegation play-off 
The last placed teams of the two pools were drawn in head-to-head rounds. Uzbekistan was relegated to Asia/Oceania Zone Group II in 2017.

Uzbekistan vs. South Korea

Final placements 

  advanced to World Group II play-offs.
  was relegated to Asia/Oceania Group II in 2017.

See also 
 Fed Cup structure

References

External links 
 Fed Cup website

2016 Fed Cup Asia/Oceania Zone